Baddeck, Nova Scotia is a small village on Cape Breton Island with several historic buildings, including:
The Telegraph House - Constructed in 1861
Saint Peter's and Saint John's Anglican Church - Constructed in 1883
Gilbert H. Grosvenor Hall - Constructed 1885–1886
Alexander Graham Bell Estate - Constructed in 1888 (first building) and 1893 (second building)
Victoria County Court House - Constructed in 1889
Bras d'Or House - Constructed in 1894
St. Mark's Masonic Lodge - Constructed in 1898
Kidston Island Lighthouse - Constructed in 1912
The Bras d'Or Yacht Club - Founded in 1904 and building constructed in 1913

Buildings and structures in Victoria County, Nova Scotia